Dogatana is a 1981 album by Japanese jazz guitarist Kazumi Watanabe. As usual for Watanabe, it features many acclaimed musicians. The album, compared to other Watanabe works, has a very acoustic sound and is characterized by peculiar guitar "duets".

It was released on Columbia Records, then re-released many times.
The sleeve reads: "This album is dedicated to the memories of Akira Aimi".

Track listing
 "Nuevo Espresso"
 "Loosey Goosey"
 "Ti-Fa-Let"
 "Island"
 "Diana"
 "Waterfall Autumn"
 "Please Don't Bundle Me"
 "Haru No Tsurara"

Personnel
Kazumi Watanabe - Ovation Adamas guitar (1, 2, 4, 5, 6, 7), Roland MC-4 (3, 8), Arp odyssey (3, 8), prophet 5 (3, 8), prophet 1 (8), Aria double neck (3, 8)
Mike Mainieri - vibraphone (1)
Osamu Ishida - Ovation Adamas (2)
June Yamagishi - Ovation Adamas (2)
Larry Coryell - Ovation Adamas (7)
Dave Liebman - alto flute (4)
Warren Berhardt - piano (6)
Nobuyoshi Ino - bass (8)
Hideo Yamaki - drums (8)

Additional personnel
Scott Litt, James Farber - recording, mixing
Aki Ikuta - art direction
Kenji Sugiyama - design
Nobuyuki Kuwabara - illustrations

1981 albums
Kazumi Watanabe albums